Ziyuan is a series of remote sensing satellites operated by the People's Republic of China. Several Ziyuan satellites are operated jointly with Brazil's National Institute for Space Research under the China–Brazil Earth Resources Satellite program.

Ziyuan satellites are based on the Phoenix-Eye-1 or Phoenix-Eye-2 satellite buses - the Phoenix-Eye-1 is used for CBERS missions while the Phoenix-Eye-2 is used for the remaining satellites. The Ziyuan-II series satellites are operated by the Chinese military. The Ziyuan-III series satellites are operated by the Ministry of Natural Resources.

Satellites

References 

Earth observation satellites of China
Satellite series
Spacecraft launched by Long March rockets